Indira Mestre Baro (born 21 April 1979) is a retired Cuban female volleyball player.

She was part of the Cuba women's national volleyball team at the 1998 FIVB Volleyball Women's World Championship in Japan, and also at the 2002 FIVB Volleyball Women's World Championship.

References

External links

1979 births
Living people
Cuban women's volleyball players
Volleyball players at the 2003 Pan American Games
Pan American Games silver medalists for Cuba
Place of birth missing (living people)
Pan American Games medalists in volleyball
Medalists at the 2003 Pan American Games